Cyrus Sahukar (born 6 August 1980) is an Indian actor, VJ, Writer, host, comedian and an entrepreneur. He has acted in several OTT and Bollywood films.

Early life and family 
Cyrus Sahukar was born in the military headquarters of MHOW, Indore on August 6, 1980, to Colonel Behram Sahukar and writer Nimeran Sahukar. His father is a Parsi while his mother is of Punjabi origin. His paternal grandfather was a brigadier, Adi Sahukar, who served in the army alongside Sam Manekshaw. His parents separated at the age of 4 and he went on to live with his grandmother in Delhi.

Cyrus has an elder sister, Preeti Philip, who is an artist. He spent his childhood in Delhi where he did his schooling from St Columba's School, Delhi and he graduated from the Delhi College of Arts and Commerce of Delhi University. By the age of 14, he dabbled in music and was a lead singer of his band in School. After he turned 18, he won the MTV Vj hunt along with Mini Mathur and Asif Seth and moved to Mumbai.

Career

Early years 
Cyrus Sahukar started performing in theater and acted in school plays from the age of 6. By the age of 14, he was a part of IPS Kiran Bedi'''s Literacy Mission Program, in which the students performed plays and skits for the inmates of Tihar Jail. During the same period, he acted in a play- Haroun and the sea of stories by Salman Rushdie that was a part of Barry John's Red Noses Club. At 15, he performed a musical show called Thank you for the music, directed by Stephen Marazzi, which was his first professional endeavour as a singer. He later started assisting Roshan Abbas. 

At 16, Sahukar began his career in Delhi, hosting a radio show called Radio Rampage. In the same year, he worked on the production and acted in Andrew Lloyd Webber's Starlight Express and Roshan Abbas's Graffiti Postcards from School. Sahukar also started doing radio voice-overs and jingles under his direction. His first jingle was for the brand Harpic.

 Years as a VJ on MTV (2000-2010) 
Cyrus’ MTV journey began with winning MTV VJ Hunt alongside Mini Mathur and Asif Seth. He also hosted MTV Chill Out in 1999. In 2000, he was the face of a show titled MTV Fully Faltoo. He also portrayed an assortment of bizarre personas in multiple other shows including Piddhu The Great, based on the Indian cricketer-commentator Navjot Singh Sidhu, and two seasons of Rendezvous with Semi Girebaal, which was his unusual take on the chat show Rendezvous with Simi Garewal. Semi Girebaal, the parody, had higher TRP than the original show. Cyrus also hosted MTV Roadies season 1 in 2003.

In 2004, Sahukar collaborated with his fellow VJ and funnyman Cyrus Broacha in a show called MTV123 which later became Cy vs Cy. Cyrus Sahukar, Ayushmann Khurrana, and an ex-roadie contestant Shambhavi Sharma starred in MTV’s Fully Faltoo Film Festival.

Sahukar played the part of Pareshaan Awasthi in Bechaare Zameen Par, an hour-long feature that was a parody of the Indian film Taare Zameen Par (2007). Sahukar then went on to play 25 characters ranging from engineer Bobby Chadda to Paromita an NGO worker, Mr. Banerjee, Cyrus Macchiwala, Rapper AJ, in the mockumentary series Kick-Ass Morning (2009) among various other shows.

 TV Career 
By 2008, he branched out from MTV to work with channels like POGO, Star TV, UTV, and Zee TV as a host on various game shows. He hosted the entrepreneurial reality show called Business Baazigar (2006) on ZeeTV. He also hosted 300 episodes of POGO channel’s game show, Hole in the wall (2008) and POGO All-stars. He worked with Bloomberg UTV India as an anchor of the business news channel's business reality show called The Assignment Season 1 (2008). He also hosted The Pogo Amazing Kids awards in 2008.  

Sahukar went on to host HDFC SpellBee (2009) on the National Geographic channel. In the same year, he hosted the world's largest wildlife quiz challenge Wild Wisdom Quiz (2009 and 2019). He also hosted another quiz show on Nat Geo, the national Olympiad, Teenovators Season 1 (2012) developed in association with Manipal University.

In 2012, he co-hosted India's Got Talent on Colors season 4 (2012) alongside Manish Paul. In the following year, Cyrus hosted about 90 episodes of Sab Khelo Sab Jeeto on Sony SAB (2013). He was also the host of the online show The Bench (2013).

Sahukar was seen playing puppeteer and host on the television comedy show, Challenge Accepted (2016), which premiered on Comedy Central. He was seen on several travel shows across International channels like Fox Life and Discovery. He also hosted Season 2 of the travel show Great Escape with Kunal and Cyrus on FOX LIFE with actor Kunal Kapoor in 2017. 

Sahukar was seen back on MTV co-hosting Elovator Pitch (2018), a speed-dating show set in an elevator produced by BBC Studios with Gaelyn Mendonca. He co-hosted The Antisocial Network (2019) with fellow prankster and MTV VJ Jose Covaco in the proceeding year. Sahukar also appeared as a judge on the MTV competitive modeling show, Forbidden Angels (2021) alongside model and actress Mugdha Godse.

In 2020, he hosted his talk show Atrangi Fireside Chat with Cyrus, on the OTT screening platform, Zee5. In 2020, Sahukar explored his culinary passions in a new cooking show, titled The Missing Apron, on TLC India. He co-hosted the Discovery Plus show Feelin Alive seasons 1 and 2 (2021-2022) with actor, Amol Parashar. He also hosted Season 2 of the travel show The Great Escape on FOX LIFE with actor Kunal Kapoor in 2017. He also hosted the Cadbury 5 Star One Tip One Hand show on DisneyPlus Hotstar.

For the past 5 years, Cyrus has been hosting the BYJU’s School Super league among other shows. 

 Films and OTT 
In the early 2000s, Sahukar dabbed into acting in Bollywood movies. His first feature film was the Anupam Kher directorial, Om Jai Jagdish (2002). Later in 2006, Sahukar bagged the role of Rahul in the film Rang de Basanti (2006), an Indian drama film written, produced, and directed by Rakeysh Omprakash Mehra. He featured in a Rakeysh Omprakash Mehra directorial again in 2009 in Delhi 6. In the following year, he played the role of Randhir Gambir, a wealthy West Delhi boy, in the Sonam Kapoor & Abhay Deol starrer Aisha (2010). A year later, Sahukar starred in The House Guest (2011). In the same year, he starred in the Sahil Sangha directorate Love Breakups Zindagi (2011), a multistarrer romantic Hindi movie. 

In 2014, Sahukar had a cameo in Sonam Kapoor’s comedy drama film Khubsoorat where he played the role of Nausher Bandookwala.  He also performed in an International film which was the first of four installments in the Heartbeat of the World anthology film series, Words with God directed by Mira Nair in 2014. Cyrus also played a role in Screenpanti's first original series- Office vs Office. Following this, he starred opposite Mini Mathur in the Amazon prime series Mind the Malhotras (2019) which went on to have a second season (2022).

In 2019, Sahukar was also seen in his first OTT movie Kadakh (2019) that premiered on Sony Liv. He also co-wrote Kadakh. In the following year, Sahukar was seen in a cameo performance in Maska (2020) on Netflix. He continued his collaboration with Sony Liv as he starred in the comedy drama series, Potluck season 1 and 2 (2020-2021).

In 2020, Sahukar acted in a show for Emmay Entertainment called Kaun Banegi Shekharvati alongside Lara Dutta, Naseeruddin Shah & Soha Ali Khan which was directed by Gaurav Chawla. Sahukar also hosted season 2 of The Lost Essence of India which captures the imagination and creates awareness about unexplored locations of India like the rugged valleys and mountains.

 Live events 
Cyrus has hosted over 3000 live events. His first awards show was as a VJ for MTV India’s event, Lycra MTV style awards (2007). Sahukar has been invited to host the launch of various luxury brands in India which include Adidas, Erricson, Samsung, Puma, and others. He began his collaboration with Tata Motors in 2015. He was also the host of the Huawei P9 launch event (2016). His next hosting for Tata Motors was alongside the world-renowned footballer, Lionel Messi, for the launch of Tata Tiago. He was also a part of Tata Motors’ Auto Expo (2016 and 2018), the largest automotive show in Asia. He also ran the TIGI Presents Femina Salon & Spa Hair Heroes (2016) awards as a host. He also played master of ceremonies as the host of the Economic Times Brand Equity and Business Leaders awards for 4 years.

In 2019, Sahukar hosted the prestigious Teacher’s Golden Thistle Awards that was created through partnership with Republic TV. He is also the official host for BBC Top Gear Awards, Good Housekeeping Magazine Awards, Vogue Women of the Year Awards.

Sahukar hosted  the GQ Men of the year Awards, Lonely Planet Awards and Hindustan Times Style Awards two years in   a row in 2019. He also hosted The SHRM India HR Excellence Awards (2019 and 2020) that was part of Asia’s largest conference, SHRM India’s Annual Conference and Expo, aired on CNBC and CNN. Sahukar had a two year contract with Google and Youtube to host some of their biggest events in India like Wizcraft AO presents Google Holiday Party (2020) and Google’s Virtual Corporate Event (2020). 

In concept events Sahukar has worked extensively with Diageo including being the official host for three years for the series Signature Masterclass. He hosted the segment Passion to Paycheck by Signature Masterclass featuring famous guests like Shah Rukh Khan, Kangana Ranaut and Vijay Devarakonda who shared their inspirational journey to success.

 Theatre 
In 2015, Sahukar teamed up with Bollywood actors Kalki Koechlin, Richa Chadda and Purab Kohli for a rib tickling play called  Trivial Disasters directed by Atul Kuman and written by Ajay Krishnan. He was also a part of the digital revolution in Theatre as he played one of the seven clowns in Rajat Kapoor's creative rendition, I Don't Like It As You Like It of the Shakespeare's classic As You Like It.

Entrepreneurship 
Along with his friend Samir Kochar, Cyrus started off his new venture, Kulcha Bros, a restaurant, in 2022.

Personal life 
Sahukar tied the knot in 2022, with his long term partner Vaishali Malahara, at Alibaug.

Selected works
 Indias got talent
 It happens only in india
 Semi Girebaal Show
 Worked as a VJ on MTV
 Played a role in Rang de Basanti, Delhi 6, Aisha and many more 
 Played the role of Rishabh Malhotra in Mind the Malhotras 
 Lead role in Potluck 
 Hosted a travel show called Chill Out in 1999
 Piddhu the Great – a spoof on Navjot Singh Sidhu in 2000
 MTV Fully Faltoo Film festival – Bechare Zameen Par
 Kick Ass Mornings, where he played over 25 characters
 The first time MTV shot a mockumentary where he played Bobby Chadda and Paromita the Neurotic
 Nat Geo – hosted the International Spelling Bee
 Fox Life – Hosted Season 2 of the travel show The Great Escape with actor Kunal Kapoor in 2017
 MTV Housefull
 Hosted India's Got Talent on Colors in 2012
 Hosted Sab Khelo Sab Jeeto on SAB in 2013
 Panel member at Hoezaay YouTube channel Live streams (Ghost)

Events
 Style Awards for MTV India
 Corporate shows – Infosys, ICICI Bank, HSBC, Hindustan lever, Hewlett Packard, HDFC, Birla Sun Life Insurance
 Launched all the Planet M stores in Mumbai, Delhi, Chandigarh and many other cities
 GQ Men of the Year 
 ET Business awards

Filmography

TV Shows

Films

OTT Shows/Web Series

Theatre

References

External links

1982 births
Living people
Male actors from Indore
Indian Zoroastrians
St. Columba's School, Delhi alumni
Male actors in Hindi cinema
Male actors in Hindi television
21st-century Indian male actors
People from Indore
Parsi people
Indian VJs (media personalities)
Indian game show hosts